Andrzej Walkowiak (born 21 January 1961) is a Polish politician and journalist.  He is a member of the Sejm for Poland Comes First, having been a member for Law and Justice from 2005 to 2010.

He was elected to the Sejm on 25 September 2005, getting 5203 votes in 4 Bydgoszcz district, standing for Law and Justice (PiS).  He joined Poland Comes First when that party split from PiS in 2010.

See also
Members of Polish Sejm 2005-2007

External links
Andrzej Walkowiak - parliamentary page - includes declarations of interest, voting record, and transcripts of speeches.

1961 births
Living people
Politicians from Bydgoszcz
Polish journalists
Members of the Polish Sejm 2005–2007
Poland Comes First politicians
Law and Justice politicians
Members of the Polish Sejm 2007–2011